Chi Chi (September 1954 – 22 July 1972) was a well-known female giant panda at London Zoo in England.

Chi Chi was not London Zoo's first giant panda; Ming was one of four that arrived in 1938. However, it was Chi Chi who became the Zoo's star attraction and England's best-loved zoo animal.

Chi Chi is now a stuffed exhibit at the Natural History Museum in London.

Life
Chi Chi was born in the wild in Sichuan, China. She was caught in May 1955 in Baoxing, Sichuan, and moved to the Beijing Zoo in June. In May 1957, Kliment Voroshilov made a request for a panda for the Moscow Zoo during his visit to China, and she was sent to Moscow with another panda in the same month. However, the attempts to mate them were unsuccessful due to sexual imprinting as a result of being reared by human keepers. The Russians suspected that both pandas were male, and as a result, the Soviets returned Chi Chi to China in exchange for another panda in January 1958. In May of the same year, the Austrian animal broker, Heini Demmer, acquired Chi Chi from Beijing Zoo in exchange for an impressive collection of African hoofstock and brought the animal back to Moscow Zoo. After resting for a week, the panda journeyed to Tierpark Berlin, the zoo in East Berlin. By then, Chi Chi had already been sold to Brookfield Zoo in Illinois, United States. However, the Treasury Department stepped in and announced that the US trade embargo on goods from China extended even to pandas. Chi Chi was thus refused entry to the US.

The Frankfurt Zoological Garden provided a temporary home for the panda until Demmer decided to temporarily hire the animal out to European zoos. She then visited Copenhagen Zoo before she arrived at London Zoo on 5 September 1958. The Zoological Society of London had stated that it would not encourage collection of wild pandas, but accepted Chi Chi since she had already been collected. Although Chi Chi's visit was originally planned to last for only three weeks, it was decided to buy her for £12,000. Chi Chi became property of London Zoo on 26 September 1958. Around this time, photographer Stanley Long created a series of stereoscopic 3D views of Chi Chi for the VistaScreen publishing company.

An elderly gentleman responded to a call for new sources of bamboo. He lived in a cottage on the edge of Menabilly Woods, on the Menabilly Estate in Cornwall. 'The Captain', as the man was respectfully known by locals, cut down a sample of the bamboo from the dense thickets growing around his cottage and sent it up to London. Chi Chi ate some of it and the ZSL engaged the Captain to provide a regular supply. The Captain enlisted the help of the local Scout group and a handful of scouts soon became the official bamboo suppliers to Chi Chi. The boys would take it to the house of Mike Kerris, their scout leader, after they had cut it on Sundays. Then, first thing on Monday morning, he would load it up and take the bamboo to Par railway station, where it was weighed and then put on a train to London Zoo. The Polkerris Scouts sent bamboo to Chi Chi until she died in 1972. Polkerris Scout Group were awarded a badge of Chi Chi Panda, which is worn on their scarf. In 1974, then-Prime Minister Edward Heath brought two new pandas from China: Ching-Ching (female) and Chia-Chia (male). The Polkerris Scout Group once again began cutting bamboo to send to the zoo.

Chi Chi was an inspiration for Sir Peter Scott's simple but distinctive logo design for the World Wildlife Fund. However, the organization's current logo is not the logo designed by Peter Scott but a later one, designed for WWF in 1986 when it changed its name from World Wildlife Fund to World Wide Fund for Nature.

Chi Chi died at London Zoo on 22 July 1972 and was mourned by the nation. A post mortem was conducted. Her remains, now a stuffed exhibit, sit in a glass case, at London's Natural History Museum.

See also 
 Other notable animals at London Zoo
 Panda diplomacy
 Tián Tián, giant panda at Edinburgh Zoo

References

Further reading 
Heini Demmer, Ute Demmer & Erich Tylinek: Tschitschi der Bambusbär. Artia, Prague 1961.

Individual giant pandas
1954 animal births
1972 animal deaths
Social history of London
Individual animals in England
China–United Kingdom relations
London Zoo
Animals as diplomatic gifts
20th century in London